is a town located in Hachijō Subprefecture, Tokyo Metropolis, Japan. , the town had an estimated population of 7,056, and a population density of 97.7 persons per km². Electric power for the town is provided by a geothermal power station and by a wind farm.

Geography
Warmed by the Kuroshio Current, the town has a warmer and wetter climate than central Tokyo. All of the town's residents live on the island of Hachijō-jima.

Neighboring municipalities
Tokyo Metropolis
Aogashima, Tokyo
Mikurajima, Tokyo

Population
The population of Hachijō  was 7613.

Climate

History
During the Edo period, Hachijōjima was known as a place of exile for convicts. This practice ended in the Meiji period, and the island residents developed an economy based on fishing, sericulture, and agriculture. Hachijō Subprefecture was organized on April 1, 1908, and included the villages of Mitsune, Nakanogo, Kashitate, Sueyoshi and Ōkago. The villages of Toruchi and Utsuki on Hachijōkojima were organized on May 3, 1947. The five villages of Hachijōjima merged on October 1, 1954 to form the village of Hachijō. On April 1, 1955, the two villages of Hachijōkojima also merged with the village of Hachijō, which was promoted to town status. However, in March 1966, the residents of Hachijōkojima voted to abandon their island, citing the inaccessibility of basic public services and economic difficulties, and Hachijōkojima became a deserted island from June 1969.

Economy
Fishing and tourism are the mainstays of the economy of Hachijō.

Education
The town government operates three public elementary and three public junior high schools.

Junior high schools:
 Fuji Junior High School (富士中学校)
 Mihara Junior High School (三原中学校)
 Okago Junior High School (大賀郷中学校)

Elementary schools:
 Mihara Elementary School (三原小学校)
 Mitsune Elementary School (三根小学校)
 Okago Elementary School (大賀郷小学校)

The Tōkyō Metropolitan Government Board of Education operates .

Transportation
Hachijōjima is accessible both by aircraft and by ferry. A pedestrian ferry leaves Tōkyō once every day at 10 p.m., and arrives at Hachijōjima at 9:00 a.m. the following day. Air travel to Hachijojima Airport takes 45 minutes from Tōkyō International Airport (Haneda).

Sister city relations
 - Maui County, Hawaii, United States

Gallery

See also 

Runin: Banished, a 2004 film about convicts exiled to Hachijōjima, and their attempts to escape.
Battle Royale, a controversial 2000 film filmed on the neighbouring, uninhabited island, Hachijō-kojima, although not set there.

References

External links
Hachijō Town Official Website 
The Anchor Pub in Hachijō Town

Towns in Tokyo
Populated coastal places in Japan